Trinity Law School is the law school of Trinity International University, an evangelical Christian university in Bannockburn, Illinois.  Although it is accredited by the Higher Learning Commission (as part of Trinity International University) and approved by the State Bar of California, it is not accredited by the American Bar Association (ABA).  The school offers a Juris Doctor (J.D.) program on campus or online, an online Master of Legal Studies (MLS) program, and a joint B.A./J.D. degree program with California Baptist University.

History
Trinity Law School, as it is now known, was founded in 1980 as the Simon Greenleaf School of Law.  It was originally located at Calvary Chapel Costa Mesa, in Santa Ana, California, and in 1982 it relocated to Anaheim, California. In 1997, it relocated from Anaheim to its current location at 2200 N. Grand Ave. in Santa Ana. It was named in honor of the nineteenth century Harvard law professor Simon Greenleaf who was an authority on the laws of evidence and also wrote The Testimony of the Evangelists: The Gospels Examined by the Rules of Evidence, which was a work of Christian apologetics concerning the evidence for the resurrection of Jesus Christ.

The Simon Greenleaf School of Law was cofounded by John Warwick Montgomery. Montgomery rose to prominence in the 1960s as a confessional Lutheran theologian and as a Christian apologist. He held the chair of Professor of Church History at Trinity Evangelical Divinity School in Deerfield, Illinois (1964–74). A founding board of trustees collaborated with Montgomery to establish in 1980 the Simon Greenleaf School of Law.  It commenced operations by offering evening classes that led to the J.D. degree as well as a Bachelor of Science in Law (B.S.L.). Additionally, a one-and-a-half year post-graduate course in Christian Apologetics and International Human Rights was offered that led to the conferral of a Master of Arts degree.

In 1997, the law school became a part of Trinity International University (TIU), an evangelical Christian institution of higher education headquartered in Deerfield, Illinois, and operated by the Evangelical Free Church of America.

Accreditation and curricula
Trinity Law School is one of 20 law schools to be approved by the Committee of Bar Examiners of the State Bar of California. It became regionally accredited by the Higher Learning Commission of the North Central Association accreditation when it joined Trinity International University in 1997. Trinity Law School is not accredited by the American Bar Association (ABA).

According to Trinity Law's website, graduation from Trinity may not qualify a graduate to practice law in any state, other than California. ". . . this law school may not qualify a student to take the bar examination or be admitted to practice law in jurisdictions other than California."

Bar pass rate
In October 2020, 25% of Trinity graduates taking the California bar exam for the first time passed, compared to an overall pass rate of 74% among first-time takers.

Rankings and awards
In January 2014, Trinity Law School ranked second on The National Jurist's list of "Most Devout Christian Law Schools," among Liberty University, Regent University, Pepperdine University, and Baylor University. In January 2016, they ranked third on the same list.

In March 2014, Trinity Law School's Moot Court team placed first in the Frederick Douglass National Moot Court Competition, held in Milwaukee, Wisconsin. Trinity Law School placed ahead of Georgetown University Law Center, two teams from Columbia Law School, and the University of Texas School of Law. In total, 17 schools competed.

Prior to earning that title, they placed second in the Western Regional Championship, held in January 2014 in Sacramento, California, which was the qualifier for the final in Wisconsin. USC Gould School of Law and University of San Diego School of Law were among the schools they defeated.

Because Trinity Law School is not accredited by the ABA, it is not ranked by U.S. News & World Report's 2017 graduate school survey.

Publications
Trinity Law School was the publisher of Journal of Christian Legal Thought, a publication of Christian Legal Society, from 2013-2016. It also publishes Trinity Law Review, a scholarly journal that is operated by invited students.

Notable People
Notable founding members of the faculty teaching in the defunct Master of Arts program included Harold Lindsell, Walter Martin, Josh McDowell, and Rod Rosenbladt.

The first dean of the law school during the transition from Simon Greenleaf University to Trinity International University was Shannon "Verleur" Spann (a 1990s graduate of Simon Greenleaf Law School), whose husband, Johnny Micheal Spann (a CIA paramilitary operations officer), was the first American killed in Afghanistan during Operation Enduring Freedom.

Scott Lively, a conservative Christian pastor known for calling for criminalization of "the public advocacy of homosexuality" and his support of the Ugandan Anti-Homosexuality Bill, received a J.D. from Trinity Law School.

References

External links
 
 

Educational institutions established in 1980
Law schools in California
Trinity International University